Killadi Raman is a 2011 Malayalam film directed by Thulasidas, starring Mukesh, Siddique and Meghana Nair in the lead roles. The film released on 9 December 2011 alongside Happy Durbar, another Mukesh starrer.

Plot
Killadi Raman is about the vagaries and paradoxes of life. Mahadevan's life takes a turn when he witnesses an accident, where Radhika has been hit by a vehicle. He takes her to a hospital but it only lands him in more trouble, when Meera, Radhika's friend, approaches him.

Cast
 Mukesh as Mahadevan
 Siddique as Chandru
 Meghna Nair as Meera
 Lena as Seethalakshmi
 Flemin Francis
 Lalu Alex as Prabhakaran Thampi
 Priya Lal as Radhika
 Jagathy Sreekumar as Kuriakose
 Guinness Pakru as Bada Bhai
 Jaffar Idukki as Manikandan
 Kochupreman as Abdul Gafoor
 Narayanankutty
 Sreelatha Namboothiri
 Rani Maria

References

External links
 

2010s Malayalam-language films
2011 comedy-drama films
Films directed by Thulasidas
2011 films